Valentin Verga (born 7 October 1989) is an Argentine-born Dutch field hockey player who plays as a midfielder or forward for Amsterdam.

Club career
Verga has played his whole senior career for Amsterdam. In the Dutch winter break in 2017, he was the first Dutch player to play in the Malaysia Hockey League, he played for
Terengganu. In the winter of 2019, he returned to Malaysia, this time he played for UniKL.

International career
At the 2012 Summer Olympics, he competed for the national team in the men's tournament, winning a silver medal.  He was also part of the Netherlands 2016 Summer Olympic team.  His father Alejandro was also an Olympic hockey player, but for Argentina. In 2018, Verga played in his third World Cup, where they won the silver medal. Due to his decision to play in the 2019 Malaysia Hockey League, he was not selected for the 2019 FIH Pro League. After the 2019 European Championships he returned in the national team for the FIH Olympic Qualifier against Pakistan. In February 2020 he was dropped from the national team's training squad for the 2020 Summer Olympics.

References

External links
 

1989 births
Living people
Dutch male field hockey players
Argentine emigrants to the Netherlands
Field hockey players from Buenos Aires
Male field hockey midfielders
Male field hockey forwards
2010 Men's Hockey World Cup players
Field hockey players at the 2012 Summer Olympics
2014 Men's Hockey World Cup players
Field hockey players at the 2016 Summer Olympics
2018 Men's Hockey World Cup players
Olympic field hockey players of the Netherlands
Olympic silver medalists for the Netherlands
Olympic medalists in field hockey
Medalists at the 2012 Summer Olympics
Amsterdamsche Hockey & Bandy Club players
Men's Hoofdklasse Hockey players